Takhoalok Island is an island located within Coronation Gulf, south of Victoria Island, in the Kitikmeot Region, Nunavut, Canada.

Other islands in the vicinity include Anchor Island, Duke of York Archipelago, Hokagon Island, Doak Island, Kingak Island, Mangak Island, and Nanukton Island.

References

Islands of Coronation Gulf
Uninhabited islands of Kitikmeot Region